Joakim Dvärby (born 2 February 1989) is a Swedish judoka.

He is the silver medallist of the 2017 Judo Grand Prix The Hague and is scheduled to represent Sweden at the 2020 Summer Olympics.

References

External links
 

1989 births
Living people
Swedish male judoka
Judoka at the 2019 European Games
21st-century Swedish people